Bartolomé de Cárdenas (c. 1575–1628)  was a Portuguese-born painter, working in Spain.

Life
According to Antonio Palomino, Cardenas was a native of Portugal, who, while still very young, went to Madrid, where he became the pupil of Alonso Sanchez Coello, and achieved a deservedly high reputation. He painted most of the cloisters of the convent of Nuestra Senora de Atocha, at Madrid. In the later part of his life he went to Valladolid, where he painted many altar-pieces, and decorated the cloisters of the convent of San Pablo. He died at Valladolid in 1606.

References

Sources
 

16th-century Spanish painters
Spanish male painters
17th-century Spanish painters
Year of birth unknown
1628 deaths
Year of birth uncertain